Lt. Col. Charles Mawhood (23 December 1729 – 29 August 1780) was a British army officer during the 18th century, most noted for his command during the Battle of Princeton.

Military career
His military service began with purchase of a cornetcy in 1st Dragoon Guards (1 August 1752).  He served in the Seven Years' War (1756–1763), initially as a Captain in the 15th Light Dragoons, then transferred to 18th Light Dragoons.  He subsequently saw action in Germany as aide-de-camp to Lord Granby.  He continued to rise in rank during the peace, first to major in the 3rd Foot on 17 May 1763, then to lieutenant colonel of the 19th Foot on 17 June 1767.  He transferred to the 17th Foot on 26 October 1775 and served with this regiment during General Howe's early campaigns of the American War of Independence.

Battle of Princeton
Mawhood was left in command of a force at Princeton, New Jersey by Lord Cornwallis in January 1777 while Cornwallis chased after George Washington's army after the Battle of Trenton. 
After Cornwallis's attack in Trenton was stopped, Washington sneaked his army around that of Cornwallis and attacked the Princeton garrison.  Mawhood acquitted himself well in the battle, but much of the garrison was lost, and the British were driven out of most of New Jersey.
Mawhood continued to serve in North America, seeing further action during the 1777–1778 Philadelphia campaign leading a mixed force of regulars, loyalists and rangers in a series of raids through New Jersey.

Gibraltar
Highly esteemed in England following the Battle of Princeton, he was chosen to raise a new regiment, the Royal Manchester Volunteers (72nd Foot), for service at the besieged garrison of Gibraltar. Mawhood died during the siege on 29 August 1780 after suffering from a gall-stone.

References

Bibliography

1729 births
1780 deaths
Gentlemen Ushers
1st King's Dragoon Guards officers
15th The King's Hussars officers
18th Royal Hussars officers
Buffs (Royal East Kent Regiment) officers
Green Howards officers
Royal Leicestershire Regiment officers
British Army personnel of the American Revolutionary War
British Army personnel of the Seven Years' War